Elin Anna Sofie Westerlund (born  4 February 1990) is a Swedish athlete who specialises in the 100 metres hurdles. She competed at the 2016 European Championships in Amsterdam, Netherlands. She is also in a relationship with Dutch athlete Eelco Sintnicolaas, who specialises in the multi-events (decathlon).

Personal bests

Outdoor

Indoor

References

External links 
 

1990 births
Living people
People from Karlskrona
Swedish female hurdlers
Sportspeople from Blekinge County